Place Ravezies – Le Bouscat tram stop is located on line  of the tramway de Bordeaux.

Situation
The stations is located close to the Place Ravezies.

Junctions

SNCF
Ravezies station: TER Bordeaux St Jean – Pauillac – Le Verdon-sur-Mer

TBC Network
 Réseau -Bus-

Trans Gironde Network

Close by
 Place Ravezies
 Gare Ravezies
 Institut Technologique Forêt Cellulose Bois-construction Ameublement

See also
 TBC
 Tramway de Bordeaux

Bordeaux tramway stops
Tram stops in Bordeaux
Tram stops in Le Bouscat
Railway stations in France opened in 2008